Leonard Russell (born 1969) is an American football player.

Leonard Russell may also refer to:

 Leonard J. Russell (philosopher) (1884–1971), British logician and academic
 Leonard J. Russell (politician) (1932–1985), American politician; mayor of Cambridge, Massachusetts
 Leonard Russell (journalist), British journalist